The Federal Central Tax Office (abbreviated BZSt) is a German federal agency responsible for administering various sections of the country's tax code. It was created out of its current parent agency, the Federal Ministry of Finance, on 1 January 2006 and has approximately 2,200 employees.

Beginning in July 2007, the BZSt began issuing a unique National identification number to every resident, replacing the formerly decentralized system. The BZSt also operates informational databases relating to the local tax offices.

Departments 
 Department "Q" ("Querschnittsaufgaben": Cross-sectional responsibilities) 
 General counsel
 Compliance
 Human Resources, Organisation, Budgetary, Internal services, IT
 Tax Information Center, Reporting, Informationszentrum Steuern, Berichtswesen, Regulatory impact analysis, Risk Management
 Automation, Legal documentation department
 Tax Department "I" ("VAT")
 Administrative assistance for domestic and foreign government agencies
 Service and foreclosure of international tax assessments 
 Refunding of value-added taxes (VAT)
 VAT Auditing
 Assessment of civil fines and criminal penalties
 Issuance and confirmation of VAT identification numbers for European Union value added tax
 EU VAT Tax Reporting
 Tax Department II ("National") 
 Assessment of insurance and fire brigade taxes
 Supervisory control for child benefit payments
 Supervisory control for government-subsidized private pension payments ("Riester" plans) 
 Refunds and exemption of capital gains taxes 
 Bank account auditing
 Application processing and reporting for tax-exempted entities
 Application processing and reporting for pension payments
 Certification of private pension plans ("Riester" and "Rürup" plans), investment taxes, and returning of paid-in capital
 Tax Info Center, VAT Service Group
 Tax Department III ("Foreign withholding taxes")
 Mutual agreement procedures as per international tax treaties
 Administrative assistance for direct taxes
 Primary contact point for foreign investors
 Relief of German capital gains withholding taxes
 Tax exemption certifications for construction industry as per §48(b) of the Income Tax Law (EStG)
 Tax processing for foreign artists and athletes 
 Information center for foreign tax relationships
 Federal Tax Auditing Department I (product branch)
 Federal Tax Auditing Department II (service branch)
 Federal Tax Auditing Department III (cross-sector task)

The Federal Tax Auditing Departments I, II and III employ approximately 500 auditors, who are responsible for reviewing the roughly 15,000 concerns incorporated in Germany.

To increase efficiency and effectiveness in the administration of taxes, the Regulatory Impact Assessment, Risk Management, and Reporting departments are being expanded.

Offices 
The BZSt's main offices are in Bonn in the district of Beuel at An der Küppe 1 and Platanenweg 33. Additional offices are in Berlin, Saarlouis, and Schwedt/Oder.

External links
 Homepage of the Bundeszentralamt für Steuern

References

German federal agencies
Taxation in Germany
Federal authorities in Bonn